N.V. Virgin Express S.A. was a Belgian airline created within the Virgin Group. It operated flights mainly to southern Europe from its hub at Brussels Airport. Ticket sales were mainly through the Internet. The airline merged with SN Brussels Airlines to form Brussels Airlines, which started operations on 25 March 2007. Virgin Express' head office was in Building 116 at Brussels Airport in Zaventem, Belgium, near Brussels.

History
Virgin Express was founded on 23 April 1996, when the Virgin Group (with chairman Richard Branson) bought the Belgian leisure airline EBA - EuroBelgian Airlines, founded by Victor Hasson and Georges Gutelman, and rebranded it Virgin Express. It also took over EBA's fleet of Boeing 737s and operated this type of aircraft from thereon. The airline soon concentrated on low-budget scheduled flights out of its Brussels hub, and became a major competitor for Sabena and later SN Brussels Airlines.

In October 2004, the Virgin Group sold its assets to SN Brussels Airlines, and both airlines were integrated into the parent holding company SN Airholding, chaired by Viscount Étienne Davignon.

On 31 March 2006, SN Brussels Airlines and Virgin Express announced their merger into a single company, named Brussels Airlines. The combined airline added long haul destinations and strengthened its position in Africa.

Destinations

Fleet

The Virgin Express fleet consisted of the following aircraft (as of August 2006):

Three Boeing 737-300 (OO-VEX, OO-VEG and OO-VEH) were fitted with winglets (March 2007).  The airline operated a maximum of 26 737s at its peak, and was given the first Joint Aviation Authorities air operator's certificate delivered by the Belgian Civil Aviation Authorities. After the merger, all ten of the Virgin Express fleet went to Brussels Airlines. The airline has since phased out its Boeing 737s.

Virgin Express also had formerly operated the following aircraft:

See also
List of defunct airlines of Belgium
SN Brussels Airlines
Virgin Express France

References

External links

Virgin Express web page at archive.org
Fleet in 2005 November

Defunct airlines of Belgium
Express
Defunct European low-cost airlines
Airlines established in 1996
Airlines disestablished in 2007
Zaventem
2007 disestablishments in Belgium
Belgian companies established in 1996